The women's qualification for football tournament at the 2007 All-Africa Games.

Qualification stage

Zone I (North Africa)
Algeria qualified automatically as hosts.

Zone II (West Africa 1)

|}
Senegal qualified.

Zone III (West Africa 2)
Ghana qualified automatically.

Zone IV (Central Africa)

|}
Cameroon qualified but withdrew the tournament later.

Zone V (East Africa)

|}
Match between Kenya and Tanzania not played, no qualified team.

Zone VI (Southern Africa)

|}
Mozambique and South Africa qualified but Mozambique withdrew the tournament later.

Zone VII (Indian Ocean)
No representative team.

Qualifying teams
The following 6 nations qualified for women's play at the 2007 All Africa Games.

External links
African Games (Women) 2007 - Rec.Sport.Soccer Statistics Foundation

Qualification
2007